LÉ Ferdia (A16) was an auxiliary ship in the Irish Naval Service. She was named after Ferdia (Ferdiad), a mythical hero of the Ulster Cycle. She served as a patrol boat. Originally a Danish ship, the MFV Helen Basse, she was leased by the INS in 1977–78 and was later a  seismic survey vessel.

References

1965 ships
Former naval ships of the Republic of Ireland
Ships built in Denmark